The 2013–14 San Jose State Spartans men's basketball team representsed San Jose State University during the 2013–14 NCAA Division I men's basketball season. The Spartans, led by first year head coach Dave Wojcik, played their home games at the Event Center Arena and were first year members of the Mountain West Conference. They finished the season 7–24, 1–17 in Mountain West play to finish in last place. They lost in the first round of the Mountain West Conference tournament to Boise State.

Preseason roster changes

Departures
Many players from the previous season left with eligibility remaining. Athletic director Gene Bleymaier explained in 2014: "Last year, we were faced with a situation that needed to be dealt with in a major fashion. The coaching staff was not retained, and several players were not invited back for the 2013-14 season. Only four players returned from the 2012-13 team."

Incoming transfers

*Redshirted this season per NCAA transfer rules.

Recruiting

Roster

Schedule

|-
!colspan=9 style="background:#005a8b; color:#c79900;"| Exhibition

|-
!colspan=9 style="background:#005a8b; color:#c79900;"| Regular season

|-
!colspan=9 style="background:#005a8b; color:#c79900;"| Mountain West tournament

References

San Jose State Spartans men's basketball seasons
San Jose State
San Jose State Spartans men's basketball
San Jose State Spartans men's basketball